The 1876 United States presidential election in West Virginia took place on November 7, 1876, as part of the 1876 United States presidential election. West Virginia voters chose five representatives, or electors, to the Electoral College, who voted for president and vice president.

West Virginia was won by Samuel J. Tilden, the former governor of New York (D–New York), running with Thomas A. Hendricks, the governor of Indiana and future vice president, with 56.75% of the popular vote, against Rutherford B. Hayes, the governor of Ohio (R-Ohio), running with Representative William A. Wheeler, with 42.15% of the vote.

With his win, Tilden became the first Democratic presidential candidate to win West Virginia.

The Greenback Party chose industrialist Peter Cooper and former representative Samuel Fenton Cary, received 1.11% of the vote.

Results

References 

West Virginia
1876
1876 West Virginia elections